is a Japanese former swimmer. He competed in the men's 200 metre breaststroke at the 1960 Summer Olympics.

References

External links
 

1937 births
Living people
Olympic swimmers of Japan
Swimmers at the 1960 Summer Olympics
Sportspeople from Tokyo
Japanese male breaststroke swimmers